Newball is a settlement and civil parish about 7 miles from Lincoln, in the West Lindsey district, in the county of Lincolnshire, England. In 2001 the parish had a population of 54. The parish touches Apley, Barlings, Bullington, Fulnetby and Stainton By Langworth.

History 
The name "Newball" means 'New fortification'. Newball was recorded in the Domesday Book as Neuberie. In 1331 a manorial chapel was licensed for the manor of John de Bayeux. Newball was a township in the parish of Stainton-by Langworth it became a separate parish in 1866. On 24 March 1887 part of Bullington was transferred to the parish. On 1 April 1935 the parish of Coldstead was abolished and merged with Newball.

References 

 

Villages in Lincolnshire
Civil parishes in Lincolnshire
West Lindsey District